This is a list of Canadian films which were released in 2002:

See also
 2002 in Canada
 2002 in Canadian television

External links
Feature Films Released In 2002 With Country of Origin Canada at IMDb
Canada's Top Ten for 2002 (list of top ten Canadian feature films, selected in a process administered by TIFF)
 List of 2002 box office number-one films in Canada

2002
2002 in Canadian cinema
Canada